2020 Colombian protests may refer to:
2019–2020 Colombian protests.
Javier Ordóñez protests.